War Without End may refer to:

"War Without End" (Babylon 5), an episode of the American science fiction television series Babylon 5
War Without End (album), a 2008 release by the American thrash metal band Warbringer